Nero Claudius Caesar Augustus Germanicus (born Lucius Domitius Ahenobarbus; 15 December AD 37 – 9 June AD 68), was the fifth Roman emperor and final emperor of the Julio-Claudian dynasty, reigning from AD 54 until his death in AD 68. He was adopted by the Roman emperor Claudius at the age of 13 and succeeded him on the throne. Nero was popular with the members of his Praetorian Guard and lower-class commoners in Rome and its provinces, but he was deeply resented by the Roman aristocracy. Most contemporary sources describe him as tyrannical, self-indulgent, and debauched. After being declared a public enemy by the Roman Senate, he committed suicide at age 30.

Nero was born at Antium in AD 37, the son of Gnaeus Domitius Ahenobarbus and Agrippina the Younger, a great-granddaughter of the emperor Augustus. When Nero was two years old, his father died. His mother married the emperor Claudius, who eventually adopted Nero as his heir; when Claudius died in AD 54, Nero became emperor with the support of the Praetorian Guard and the Senate. In the early years of his reign Nero was advised and guided by his mother Agrippina, his tutor Seneca the Younger, and his praetorian prefect Sextus Afranius Burrus, but he soon sought to rule independently and to rid himself of restraining influences. His power struggle with his mother was eventually resolved when he had her murdered. Roman sources also implicate Nero in the deaths of his wife Claudia Octavia – supposedly so that he could marry Poppaea Sabina – and of his step brother Britannicus.

Nero's practical contributions to Rome's governance focused on diplomacy, trade, and culture. He ordered the construction of amphitheaters, and promoted athletic games and contests. He also made public appearances as an actor, poet, musician, and charioteer, which scandalised his aristocratic contemporaries as these occupations were usually the domain of slaves, public entertainers and infamous persons. The provision of such entertainments made Nero popular among lower-class citizens, but his performances undermined the Imperial dignity. The costs involved were borne by local elites either directly or through taxation, and were much resented.

During Nero's reign, the general Corbulo fought the Roman–Parthian War of 58–63, and made peace with the hostile Parthian Empire. The Roman general Suetonius Paulinus quashed a major revolt in Britain led by the Iceni's queen Boudica. The Bosporan Kingdom was briefly annexed to the empire, and the First Jewish–Roman War began. When the Roman senator Vindex rebelled, with support from the eventual Roman emperor Galba, Nero was declared a public enemy and condemned to death in absentia. He fled Rome, and on 9 June AD 68 he committed suicide. His death sparked a brief period of civil war known as the Year of the Four Emperors.

Most Roman sources offer overwhelmingly negative assessments of his personality and reign. The historian Tacitus claims the Roman people thought him compulsive and corrupt. Suetonius tells that many Romans believed that the Great Fire of Rome was instigated by Nero to clear land for his planned  "Golden House". Tacitus claims that Nero seized Christians as scapegoats for the fire and had them burned alive, seemingly motivated not by public justice but by personal cruelty. Some modern historians question the reliability of the ancient sources on Nero's tyrannical acts, considering his popularity among the Roman commoners. In the eastern provinces of the Empire, a popular legend arose that Nero had not died and would return. After his death, at least three leaders of short-lived, failed rebellions presented themselves as "Nero reborn" in order to gain popular support.

Early life

Nero was born Lucius Domitius Ahenobarbus on 15 December 37ADin Antium (modern Anzio). He was an only-child, the son of the politician Gnaeus Domitius Ahenobarbus and Agrippina the Younger. His mother Agrippina was the sister of the third Roman emperor Caligula. Nero was also the great-great-grandson of former emperor Augustus (descended from Augustus' only daughter, Julia).

The ancient biographer Suetonius, who was critical of Nero's ancestors, wrote that emperor Augustus had reproached Nero's grandfather for his unseemly enjoyment of violent gladiator games. According to Jürgen Malitz, Suetonius tells that Nero's father was known to be "irascible and brutal", and that both "enjoyed chariot races and theater performances to a degree not befitting their position". Suetonius also mentions that when Nero's father Domitius was congratulated by his friends for the birth of his son, he replied that any child born to him and Agrippina would have a detestable nature and become a public danger.

Domitius died in 40 AD. A few years before his father's death, his father was involved in a serious political scandal. His mother and his two surviving sisters, Agrippina and Julia Livilla, were exiled to a remote island in the Mediterranean Sea. His mother was said to have been exiled for plotting to overthrow the emperor Caligula. Nero's inheritance was taken from him, and he was sent to live with his paternal aunt Domitia Lepida the Younger, the mother of later emperor Claudius's third wife, Messalina.

After Caligula's death, Claudius became the new Roman Emperor. Nero's mother married Claudius in 49AD, becoming his fourth wife. By February, 49 AD, his mother had persuaded Claudius to adopt her son Nero.

After Nero's adoption by the emperor, "Claudius" became part of his name: Nero Claudius Caesar Drusus Germanicus. Claudius had gold coins issued to mark the adoption. Classics professor Josiah Osgood has written that "the coins, through their distribution and imagery alike, showed that a new Leader was in the making." However, David Shotter noted that, despite events in Rome, Nero's step-brother Britannicus was more prominent in provincial coinages during the early 50s.

Nero formally entered public life as an adult in 51AD at approximately 14 years old. When he turned 16, Nero married Claudius' daughter (his step-sister), Claudia Octavia. Between the years 51AD and 53AD, he gave several speeches on behalf of various communities, including the Ilians; the Apameans (requesting a five-year tax reprieve after an earthquake); and the northern colony of Bologna, after their settlement had suffered a devastating fire.

Claudius died in 54AD; many ancient historians claim that he was poisoned by Agrippina. Shotter has written that "Claudius' death in 54AD has usually been regarded as an event hastened by Agrippina due to signs that Claudius was showing a renewed affection for his natural son". He also notes that among ancient sources, the Roman historian Josephus was uniquely reserved in describing the poisoning as a rumor.

Contemporary sources differ in their accounts of the poisoning. Tacitus says that the poison-maker Locusta prepared the toxin, which was served to the Emperor by his servant Halotus. Tacitus also writes that Agrippina arranged for Claudius' doctor Xenophon to administer poison, in the event that the Emperor survived. Suetonius differs in some details, but also implicates Halotus and Agrippina. Like Tacitus, Cassius Dio writes that the poison was prepared by Locusta, but in Dio's account it is administered by Agrippina instead of Halotus. In Apocolocyntosis, Seneca the Younger does not mention mushrooms at all. Agrippina's involvement in Claudius' death is not accepted by all modern scholars.

Before Claudius' death, Agrippina had maneuvered to remove Claudius' sons' tutors in order to replace them with tutors that she had selected. She was also able to convince Claudius to replace two prefects of the Praetorian Guard (who were suspected of supporting Claudius' son) with Afranius Burrus (Nero's future guide). Since Agrippina had replaced the guard officers with men loyal to her, Nero was subsequently able to assume power without incident.

Reign (54–68 AD)
Most of what we know about Nero's reign comes from three ancient writers: Tacitus, Suetonius, and Greek historian Cassius Dio.

According to these ancient historians, Nero's construction projects were overly extravagant and the large number of expenditures under Nero left Italy "thoroughly exhausted by contributions of money" with "the provinces ruined". Modern historians, though, note that the period was riddled with deflation and that it is likely that Nero's spending came in the form of public-works projects and charity intended to ease economic troubles.

Early reign

Nero became emperor in 54 AD, aged sixteen years. This made him the youngest sole emperor until Elagabalus, who became emperor aged 14 in 218. As Pharaoh of Egypt, Nero adopted the royal titulary Autokrator Neron Heqaheqau Meryasetptah Tjemaahuikhasut Wernakhtubaqet Heqaheqau Setepennenu Merur ('Emperor Nero, Ruler of rulers, chosen by Ptah, beloved of Isis, the sturdy-armed one who struck the foreign lands, victorious for Egypt, ruler of rulers, chosen of Nun who loves him').

Nero's tutor, Seneca, prepared Nero's first speech before the Senate. During this speech, Nero spoke about "eliminating the ills of the previous regime". H.H. Scullard writes that "he promised to follow the Augustan model in his principate, to end all secret trials intra cubiculum, to have done with the corruption of court favorites and freedmen, and above all to respect the privileges of the Senate and individual Senators." His respect of the Senatorial autonomy, which distinguished him from Caligula and Claudius, was generally well received by the Roman Senate.

Scullard writes that Nero's mother, Agrippina, "meant to rule through her son". Agrippina murdered her political rivals: Domitia Lepida the Younger, the aunt that Nero had lived with during Agrippina's exile; Marcus Junius Silanus, a great-grandson of Augustus; and Narcissus. One of the earliest coins that Nero issued during his reign shows Agrippina on the coin's obverse side; usually, this would be reserved for a portrait of the emperor. The Senate also allowed Agrippina two lictors during public appearances, an honor that was customarily bestowed upon only magistrates and the Vestalis Maxima. In AD55, Nero removed Agrippina's ally Marcus Antonius Pallas from his position in the treasury. Shotter writes the following about Agrippina's deteriorating relationship with Nero: "What Seneca and Burrus probably saw as relatively harmless in Nero—his cultural pursuits and his affair with the slave girl Claudia Acte—were to her signs of her son's dangerous emancipation of himself from her influence." Britannicus was poisoned after Agrippina threatened to side with him. Nero, who was having an affair with Acte, exiled Agrippina from the palace when she began to cultivate a relationship with his wife Octavia.

Jürgen Malitz writes that ancient sources do not provide any clear evidence to evaluate the extent of Nero's personal involvement in politics during the first years of his reign. He describes the policies that are explicitly attributed to Nero as "well-meant but incompetent notions" like Nero's failed initiative to abolish all taxes in 58AD. Scholars generally credit Nero's advisors Burrus and Seneca with the administrative successes of these years. Malitz writes that in later years, Nero panicked when he had to make decisions on his own during times of crisis.

Nevertheless, his early administration ruled to great acclaim. A generation later those years were seen in retrospect as an exemplar of good and moderate government and described as Quinquennium Neronis by Trajan. Especially well received were fiscal reforms which among others put tax collectors under more strict control by establishing local offices to supervise their activities. After the affair of Lucius Pedanius Secundus who was murdered by a desperate slave, Nero allowed slaves to file complaints about their treatment to the authorities.

Residences
Outside of Rome, Nero had several villas or palaces built, the ruins of which can still be seen today. These included the Villa of Nero at Antium, his place of birth, where he razed the villa on the site to rebuild it on a more massive and imperial scale and including a theatre. At Subiaco, Lazio, near Rome he had 3 artificial lakes built, with waterfalls, bridges and walkways for the luxurious villa. He stayed at the Villa of Nero at Olympia, Greece, during his participation at the Olympic Games of 67 AD.

Matricide
The Oxford Encyclopedia of Ancient Greece and Rome cautiously notes that Nero's reasons for killing his mother in 59AD are "not fully understood". According to Tacitus, the source of conflict between Nero and his mother was Nero's affair with Poppaea Sabina. In Histories Tacitus writes that the affair began while Poppaea was still married to Rufrius Crispinus, but in his later work Annals Tacitus says Poppaea was married to Otho when the affair began. In Annals Tacitus writes that Agrippina opposed Nero's affair with Poppaea because of her affection for his wife Octavia. Anthony Barrett writes that Tacitus' account in Annals "suggests that Poppaea's challenge drove [Nero] over the brink". A number of modern historians have noted that Agrippina's death would not have offered much advantage for Poppaea, as Nero did not marry Poppaea until 62AD. Barrett writes that Poppaea seems to serve as a "literary device, utilized [by Tacitus] because [he] could see no plausible explanation for Nero's conduct and also incidentally [served] to show that Nero, like Claudius, had fallen under the malign influence of a woman." According to Suetonius, Nero had his former freedman Anicetus arrange a shipwreck; Agrippina survived the wreck, swam ashore and was executed by Anicetus, who reported her death as a suicide.

Decline
Modern scholars believe that Nero's reign had been going well in the years before Agrippina's death. For example, Nero promoted the exploration of the Nile river sources with a successful expedition. After Agrippina's exile, Burrus and Seneca were responsible for the administration of the Empire. However, Nero's "conduct became far more egregious" after his mother's death. Miriam T. Griffins suggests that Nero's decline began as early as 55AD with the murder of his stepbrother Britannicus, but also notes that "Nero lost all sense of right and wrong and listened to flattery with total credulity" after Agrippina's death. Griffin points out that Tacitus "makes explicit the significance of Agrippina's removal for Nero's conduct".

He began to build a new palace, the Domus Transitoria, from about AD 60. It was intended to connect all of the imperial estates that had been acquired in various ways, with the Palatine including the Gardens of Maecenas, Horti Lamiani, Horti Lolliani, etc.

In 62AD, Nero's adviser Burrus died. That same year, Nero called for the first treason trial of his reign (maiestas trial) against Antistius Sosianus. He also executed his rivals Cornelius Sulla and Rubellius Plautus. Jürgen Malitz considers this to be a turning point in Nero's relationship with the Roman Senate. Malitz writes that "Nero abandoned the restraint he had previously shown because he believed a course supporting the Senate promised to be less and less profitable."

After Burrus' death, Nero appointed two new Praetorian prefects: Faenius Rufus and Ofonius Tigellinus. Politically isolated, Seneca was forced to retire. According to Tacitus, Nero divorced Octavia on grounds of infertility, and banished her. After public protests over Octavia's exile, Nero accused her of adultery with Anicetus, and she was executed.

In 64AD during the Saturnalia, Nero married Pythagoras, a freedman.

Great Fire of Rome

The Great Fire of Rome began on the night of 18 to 19 July 64, probably in one of the merchant shops on the slope of the Aventine overlooking the Circus Maximus, or in the wooden outer seating of the Circus itself. Rome had always been vulnerable to fires, and this one was fanned to catastrophic proportions by the winds. Tacitus, Cassius Dio, and modern archaeology describe the destruction of mansions, ordinary residences, public buildings, and temples on the Aventine, Palatine, and Caelian hills. The fire burned for over seven days before subsiding; it then started again and burned for three more. It destroyed three of Rome's 14 districts and severely damaged seven more.

Some Romans thought the fire an accident, as the merchant shops were timber-framed and sold flammable goods, and the outer seating stands of the Circus were timber-built. Others claimed it was arson committed on Nero's behalf. The accounts by Pliny the Elder, Suetonius, and Cassius Dio suggest several possible reasons for Nero's alleged arson, including his creation of a real-life backdrop to a theatrical performance about the burning of Troy. Suetonius wrote that Nero started the fire to clear the site for his planned, palatial Golden House. This would include lush artificial landscapes and a 30-meter-tall statue of himself, the Colossus of Nero, sited more or less where the Colosseum would eventually be built. Suetonius and Cassius Dio claim that Nero sang the "Sack of Ilium" in stage costume while the city burned. The popular legend that Nero played the fiddle while Rome burned "is at least partly a literary construct of Flavian propaganda [...] which looked askance on the abortive Neronian attempt to rewrite Augustan models of rule".

Tacitus suspends judgment on Nero's responsibility for the fire; he found that Nero was in Antium when the fire started, and returned to Rome to organize a relief effort, providing for the removal of bodies and debris, which he paid for from his own funds. After the fire, Nero opened his palaces to provide shelter for the homeless, and arranged for food supplies to be delivered in order to prevent starvation among the survivors.

Tacitus writes that to remove suspicion from himself, Nero accused Christians of starting the fire. According to this account, many Christians were arrested and brutally executed by "being thrown to the beasts, crucified, and being burned alive". Tacitus asserts that in his imposition of such ferocious punishments, Nero was not motivated by a sense of justice, but by a penchant for personal cruelty.

Houses built after the fire were spaced out, built in brick, and faced by porticos on wide roads. Nero also built himself a new palace complex known as the Domus Aurea in an area cleared by the fire. The cost to rebuild Rome was immense, requiring funds the state treasury did not have. To find the necessary funds for the reconstruction, Nero's government increased taxation. Particularly heavy tributes were imposed on the provinces of the empire. To meet at least a portion of the costs, Nero devalued the Roman currency, increasing inflationary pressure for the first time in the Empire's history.

Later years
In 65AD, Gaius Calpurnius Piso, a Roman statesman, organized a conspiracy against Nero with the help of Subrius Flavus and Sulpicius Asper, a tribune and a centurion of the Praetorian Guard. According to Tacitus, many conspirators wished to "rescue the state" from the emperor and restore the Republic. The freedman Milichus discovered the conspiracy and reported it to Nero's secretary, Epaphroditus. As a result, the conspiracy failed and its members were executed, including Lucan, the poet. Nero's previous advisor Seneca was accused by Natalis; he denied the charges but was still ordered to commit suicide, as by this point he had fallen out of favor with Nero.

Nero was said to have kicked Poppaea to death in 65AD, before she could give birth to his second child. Modern historians, noting the probable biases of Suetonius, Tacitus, and Cassius Dio, and the likely absence of eyewitnesses to such an event, propose that Poppaea may have died after miscarriage or in childbirth. Nero went into deep mourning; Poppaea was given a sumptuous state funeral, divine honors, and was promised a temple for her cult. A year's importation of incense was burned at the funeral. Her body was not cremated, as would have been strictly customary, but embalmed after the Egyptian manner and entombed; it is not known where.

In 67, Nero married Sporus, a young boy who is said to have greatly resembled Poppaea. Nero had him castrated and married him with all the usual ceremonies, including a dowry and a bridal veil. It is believed that he did this out of regret for his killing of Poppaea.

Revolt of Vindex and Galba and Nero's death

In March 68, Gaius Julius Vindex, the governor of Gallia Lugdunensis, rebelled against Nero's tax policies. Lucius Verginius Rufus, the governor of Germania Superior, was ordered to put down Vindex's rebellion. In an attempt to gain support from outside his own province, Vindex called upon Servius Sulpicius Galba, the governor of Hispania Tarraconensis, to join the rebellion and to declare himself emperor in opposition to Nero.

At the Battle of Vesontio in May 68, Verginius' forces easily defeated those of Vindex, and the latter committed suicide. However, after defeating the rebel, Verginius' legions attempted to proclaim their own commander as Emperor. Verginius refused to act against Nero, but the discontent of the legions of Germania and the continued opposition of Galba in Hispania did not bode well for him.

While Nero had retained some control of the situation, support for Galba increased despite his being officially declared a "public enemy". The prefect of the Praetorian Guard, Gaius Nymphidius Sabinus, also abandoned his allegiance to the Emperor and came out in support of Galba.

In response, Nero fled Rome with the intention of going to the port of Ostia and, from there, to take a fleet to one of the still-loyal eastern provinces. According to Suetonius, Nero abandoned the idea when some army officers openly refused to obey his commands, responding with a line from Virgil's Aeneid: "Is it so dreadful a thing then to die?" Nero then toyed with the idea of fleeing to Parthia, throwing himself upon the mercy of Galba, or appealing to the people and begging them to pardon him for his past offences "and if he could not soften their hearts, to entreat them at least to allow him the prefecture of Egypt". Suetonius reports that the text of this speech was later found in Nero's writing desk, but that he dared not give it from fear of being torn to pieces before he could reach the Forum.

Nero returned to Rome and spent the evening in the palace. After sleeping, he awoke at about midnight to find the palace guard had left. Dispatching messages to his friends' palace chambers for them to come, he received no answers. Upon going to their chambers personally, he found them all abandoned. When he called for a gladiator or anyone else adept with a sword to kill him, no one appeared. He cried, "Have I neither friend nor foe?" and ran out as if to throw himself into the Tiber.

Returning, Nero sought a place where he could hide and collect his thoughts. An imperial freedman, Phaon, offered his villa, located  outside the city. Travelling in disguise, Nero and four loyal freedmen, Epaphroditus, Phaon, Neophytus, and Sporus, reached the villa, where Nero ordered them to dig a grave for him. At this time, Nero learned that the Senate had declared him a public enemy. Nero prepared himself for suicide, pacing up and down muttering Qualis artifex pereo ("What an artist dies in me"). Losing his nerve, he begged one of his companions to set an example by killing himself first. At last, the sound of approaching horsemen drove Nero to face the end. However, he still could not bring himself to take his own life, but instead forced his private secretary, Epaphroditus, to perform the task.
When one of the horsemen entered and saw that Nero was dying, he attempted to stop the bleeding, but efforts to save Nero's life were unsuccessful. Nero's final words were "Too late! This is fidelity!" He died on 9 June 68, the anniversary of the death of his first wife, Claudia Octavia, and was buried in the Mausoleum of the Domitii Ahenobarbi, in what is now the Villa Borghese (Pincian Hill) area of Rome. According to Sulpicius Severus, it is unclear whether Nero took his own life.

With his death, the Julio-Claudian dynasty ended. Chaos would ensue in the year of the Four Emperors.

After Nero

According to Suetonius and Cassius Dio, the people of Rome celebrated the death of Nero. Tacitus, though, describes a more complicated political environment. Tacitus mentions that Nero's death was welcomed by senators, nobility, and the upper class. The lower class, slaves, frequenters of the arena and the theater, and "those who were supported by the famous excesses of Nero", on the other hand, were upset with the news. Members of the military were said to have mixed feelings, as they had allegiance to Nero but had been bribed to overthrow him.

Eastern sources, namely Philostratus and Apollonius of Tyana, mention that Nero's death was mourned as he "restored the liberties of Hellas with a wisdom and moderation quite alien to his character" and that he "held our liberties in his hand and respected them".

Modern scholarship generally holds that, while the Senate and more well-off individuals welcomed Nero's death, the general populace was "loyal to the end and beyond, for Otho and Vitellius both thought it worthwhile to appeal to their nostalgia".

Nero's name was erased from some monuments, in what Edward Champlin regards as an "outburst of private zeal". Many portraits of Nero were reworked to represent other figures; according to Eric R. Varner, over 50 such images survive. This reworking of images is often explained as part of the way in which the memory of disgraced emperors was condemned posthumously (see damnatio memoriae). Champlin, however, doubts that the practice is necessarily negative and notes that some continued to create images of Nero long after his death. Damaged portraits of Nero, often with hammer blows directed to the face, have been found in many provinces of the Roman Empire, three recently having been identified from the United Kingdom (see damnatio memoriae).

The civil war during the year of the Four Emperors was described by ancient historians as a troubling period. According to Tacitus, this instability was rooted in the fact that emperors could no longer rely on the perceived legitimacy of the imperial bloodline, as Nero and those before him could. Galba began his short reign with the execution of many of Nero's allies. One such notable enemy included Nymphidius Sabinus, who claimed to be the son of Emperor Caligula.

Otho overthrew Galba. Otho was said to be liked by many soldiers because he had been a friend of Nero and resembled him somewhat in temperament. It was said that the common Roman hailed Otho as Nero himself. Otho used "Nero" as a surname and reerected many statues to Nero. Vitellius overthrew Otho. Vitellius began his reign with a large funeral for Nero complete with songs written by Nero.

After Nero's death in 68 AD, there was a widespread belief, especially in the eastern provinces, that he was not dead and somehow would return. This belief came to be known as the Nero Redivivus Legend. The legend of Nero's return lasted for hundreds of years after Nero's death. Augustine of Hippo wrote of the legend as a popular belief in 422 AD.

At least three Nero impostors emerged leading rebellions. The first, who sang and played the cithara or lyre, and whose face was similar to that of the dead emperor, appeared in 69 AD during the reign of Vitellius. After persuading some to recognize him, he was captured and executed. Sometime during the reign of Titus (79–81), another impostor appeared in Asia and sang to the accompaniment of the lyre and looked like Nero, but he, too, was killed. Twenty years after Nero's death, during the reign of Domitian, there was a third pretender. He was supported by the Parthians, who only reluctantly gave him up, and the matter almost came to war.

Military conflicts

Boudica's uprising

In Britannia (Britain) in 59AD, Prasutagus, leader of the Iceni tribe and a client king of Rome during Claudius' reign, had died. The client state arrangement was unlikely to survive following the death of Claudius. The will of the Iceni tribal King Prasutagus, leaving control of the Iceni to his daughters, was denied. When the Roman procurator Catus Decianus scourged Prasutagus' wife Boudica and raped her daughters, the Iceni revolted. They were joined by the Celtic Trinovantes tribe and their uprising became the most significant provincial rebellion of the 1st centuryAD. Under Queen Boudica, the towns of Camulodunum (Colchester), Londinium (London) and Verulamium (St. Albans) were burned, and a substantial body of Roman legion infantry were eliminated. The governor of the province, Gaius Suetonius Paulinus, assembled his remaining forces and defeated the Britons. Although order was restored for some time, Nero considered abandoning the province. Julius Classicianus replaced the former procurator, Catus Decianus, and Classicianus advised Nero to replace Paulinus who continued to punish the population even after the rebellion was over. Nero decided to adopt a more lenient approach by appointing a new governor, Petronius Turpilianus.

Peace with Parthia

Nero began preparing for war in the early years of his reign, after the Parthian king Vologeses set his brother Tiridates on the Armenian throne. Around 57AD and 58AD Domitius Corbulo and his legions advanced on Tiridates and captured the Armenian capital Artaxata. Tigranes was chosen to replace Tiridates on the Armenian throne. When Tigranes attacked Adiabene, Nero had to send further legions to defend Armenia and Syria from Parthia.

The Roman victory came at a time when the Parthians were troubled by revolts; when this was dealt with they were able to devote resources to the Armenian situation. A Roman army under Paetus surrendered under humiliating circumstances and though both Roman and Parthian forces withdrew from Armenia, it was under Parthian control. The triumphal arch for Corbulo's earlier victory was part-built when Parthian envoys arrived in 63 AD to discuss treaties. Given imperium over the eastern regions, Corbulo organised his forces for an invasion but was met by this Parthian delegation. An agreement was thereafter reached with the Parthians: Rome would recognize Tiridates as king of Armenia, only if he agreed to receive his diadem from Nero. A coronation ceremony was held in Italy 66AD. Dio reports that Tiridates said "I have come to you, my God, worshiping you as Mithras." Shotter says this parallels other divine designations that were commonly applied to Nero in the East including "The New Apollo" and "The New Sun". After the coronation, friendly relations were established between Rome and the eastern kingdoms of Parthia and Armenia. Artaxata was temporarily renamed Neroneia.

First Jewish War

In 66, there was a Jewish revolt in Judea stemming from Greek and Jewish religious tension. In 67, Nero dispatched Vespasian to restore order. This revolt was eventually put down in 70, after Nero's death. This revolt is famous for Romans breaching the walls of Jerusalem and destroying the Second Temple of Jerusalem.

Pursuits

Nero studied poetry, music, painting and sculpture. He both sang and played the cithara (a type of lyre). Many of these disciplines were standard education for the Roman elite, but Nero's devotion to music exceeded what was socially acceptable for a Roman of his class. Ancient sources were critical of Nero's emphasis on the arts, chariot-racing and athletics. Pliny described Nero as an "actor-emperor" (scaenici imperatoris) and Suetonius wrote that he was "carried away by a craze for popularity...since he was acclaimed as the equal of Apollo in music and of the Sun in driving a chariot, he had planned to emulate the exploits of Hercules as well."

In 67 AD Nero participated in the Olympics. He had bribed organizers to postpone the games for a year so he could participate, and artistic competitions were added to the athletic events. Nero won every contest in which he was a competitor. During the games Nero sang and played his lyre on stage, acted in tragedies and raced chariots. He won a 10-horse chariot race, despite being thrown from the chariot and leaving the race. He was crowned on the basis that he would have won if he had completed the race. After he died a year later, his name was removed from the list of winners. Champlin writes that though Nero's participation "effectively stifled true competition, [Nero] seems to have been oblivious of reality."

Nero established the Neronian games in 60AD. Modeled on Greek style games, these games included musical, gymnastic, and equestrian contests. According to Suetonius the gymnastic contests were held in the Saepta area of the Campus Martius.

Historiography
The history of Nero's reign is problematic in that no historical sources survived that were contemporary with Nero. These first histories, while they still existed, were described as biased and fantastical, either overly critical or praising of Nero. The original sources were also said to contradict on a number of events. Nonetheless, these lost primary sources were the basis of surviving secondary and tertiary histories on Nero written by the next generations of historians. A few of the contemporary historians are known by name. Fabius Rusticus, Cluvius Rufus and Pliny the Elder all wrote condemning histories on Nero that are now lost. There were also pro-Nero histories, but it is unknown who wrote them or for what deeds Nero was praised.

The bulk of what is known of Nero comes from Tacitus, Suetonius, and Cassius Dio, who were all of the upper classes. Tacitus and Suetonius wrote their histories on Nero over 50 years after his death, while Cassius Dio wrote his history over 150 years after Nero's death. These sources contradict one another on a number of events in Nero's life, including the death of Claudius, the death of Agrippina, and the Roman fire of 64 AD, but they are consistent in their condemnation of Nero.

Cassius Dio
Cassius Dio (c. 155–229) was the son of Cassius Apronianus, a Roman senator. He passed the greater part of his life in public service. He was a senator under Commodus and governor of Smyrna after the death of Septimius Severus; and afterwards suffect consul around 205, and also proconsul in Africa and Pannonia.

Books 61–63 of Dio's Roman History describe the reign of Nero. Only fragments of these books remain and what does remain was abridged and altered by John Xiphilinus, an 11th-century monk.

Dio Chrysostom
Dio Chrysostom (c. 40–120), a Greek philosopher and historian, wrote the Roman people were very happy with Nero and would have allowed him to rule indefinitely. They longed for his rule once he was gone and embraced imposters when they appeared:

Epictetus
Epictetus (c. 55–135) was the slave to Nero's scribe Epaphroditos. He makes a few passing negative comments on Nero's character in his work, but makes no remarks on the nature of his rule. He describes Nero as a spoiled, angry and unhappy man.

Josephus
The historian Josephus (c. 37–100), while calling Nero a tyrant, was also the first to mention bias against Nero. Of other historians, he said:

Lucan
Although more of a poet than historian, Lucanus (c. 39–65 AD) has one of the kindest accounts of Nero's rule. He writes of peace and prosperity under Nero, in contrast to previous war and strife. Ironically, he was later involved in a conspiracy to overthrow Nero and was executed.

Philostratus
Philostratus II "the Athenian" (c. 172–250 AD) spoke of Nero in the Life of Apollonius Tyana (Books 4–5). Although he has a generally bad or dim view of Nero, he speaks of others' positive reception of Nero in the East.

Pliny the Elder
The history of Nero by Pliny the Elder (c. 24–79 AD) did not survive. Still, there are several references to Nero in Pliny's Natural Histories. Pliny has one of the worst opinions of Nero and calls him an "enemy of mankind".

Plutarch
Plutarch (c. 46–127 AD) mentions Nero indirectly in his account of the Life of Galba and the Life of Otho, as well as in the Vision of Thespesius in Book 7 of the Moralia, where a voice orders that Nero's soul be transferred to a more offensive species. Nero is portrayed as a tyrant, but those that replace him are not described as better.

Seneca the Younger
It is not surprising that Seneca (c. 4 BC–65 AD), Nero's teacher and advisor, writes very well of Nero.

Suetonius

Suetonius (c. 69–130 AD) was a member of the equestrian order, and he was the head of the department of the imperial correspondence. While in this position, Suetonius started writing biographies of the emperors, accentuating the anecdotal and sensational aspects. By this account, Nero raped the vestal virgin Rubria.

Tacitus

The Annals by Tacitus (c. 56–117 AD) is the most detailed and comprehensive history on the rule of Nero, despite being incomplete after the year 66AD. Tacitus described the rule of the Julio-Claudian emperors as generally unjust. He also thought that existing writing on them was unbalanced:

Tacitus was the son of a procurator, who married into the elite family of Agricola. He entered his political life as a senator after Nero's death and, by Tacitus' own admission, owed much to Nero's rivals. Realising that this bias may be apparent to others, Tacitus protests that his writing is true.

 Girolamo Cardano
In 1562, Girolamo Cardano published in Basel his Encomium Neronis, which was one of the first historical references of the Modern era to portray Nero in a positive light.

In Jewish and Christian tradition

Jewish tradition
At the end of 66AD, conflict broke out between Greeks and Jews in Jerusalem and Caesarea. According to the Talmud, Nero went to Jerusalem and shot arrows in all four directions. All the arrows landed in the city. He then asked a passing child to repeat the verse he had learned that day. The child responded, "I will lay my vengeance upon Edom by the hand of my people Israel" (Ezekiel 25:14). Nero became terrified, believing that God wanted the Second Temple to be destroyed, but that he would punish the one to carry it out. Nero said, "He desires to lay waste His House and to lay the blame on me," whereupon he fled and converted to Judaism to avoid such retribution. Vespasian was then dispatched to put down the rebellion.

The Talmud adds that the sage Reb Meir Baal HaNess lived in the time of the Mishnah, and was a prominent supporter of the Bar Kokhba rebellion against Roman rule. Rabbi Meir was considered one of the greatest of the Tannaim of the third generation (139–163 AD). According to the Talmud, his father was a descendant of Nero who had converted to Judaism. His wife Bruriah is one of the few women cited in the Gemara. He is the third-most-frequently-mentioned sage in the Mishnah. Roman and Greek sources nowhere report Nero's alleged trip to Jerusalem or his alleged conversion to Judaism. There is also no record of Nero having any offspring who survived infancy: his only recorded child, Claudia Augusta, died aged 4 months.

Christian tradition

Non-Christian historian Tacitus describes Nero extensively torturing and executing Christians after the fire of 64 AD. Suetonius also mentions Nero punishing Christians, though he does so because they are "given to a new and mischievous superstition" and does not connect it with the fire.

Christian writer Tertullian (c. 155–230 AD) was the first to call Nero the first persecutor of Christians. He wrote, "Examine your records. There you will find that Nero was the first that persecuted this doctrine." Lactantius (c. 240–320) also said that Nero "first persecuted the servants of God". as does Sulpicius Severus. However, Suetonius writes that, "since the Jews constantly made disturbances at the instigation of Chrestus, the [emperor Claudius] expelled them from Rome" ("Iudaeos impulsore Chresto assidue tumultuantis Roma expulit"). These expelled "Jews" may have been early Christians, although Suetonius is not explicit. Nor is the Bible explicit, calling Aquila of Pontus and his wife, Priscilla, both expelled from Italy at the time, "Jews" (Acts 18:2).

Martyrdoms of Peter and Paul
The first text to suggest that Nero ordered the execution of an apostle is a letter by Clement to the Corinthians traditionally dated to around AD 96. The apocryphal Ascension of Isaiah, a Christian writing from the 2nd century, says, "the slayer of his mother, who himself (even) this king, will persecute the plant which the Twelve Apostles of the Beloved have planted. Of the Twelve one will be delivered into his hands"; this is interpreted as referring to Nero.

Bishop Eusebius of Caesarea (c. 275–339) was the first to write explicitly that Paul was beheaded and Peter crucified in Rome during the reign of Nero. He states that Nero's persecution led to Peter and Paul's deaths, but that Nero did not give any specific orders. However, several other accounts going back to the first century have Paul surviving his two years in Rome and travelling to Hispania, before facing trial in Rome again prior to his death.

Peter is first said to have been crucified specifically upside-down in Rome during Nero's reign (but not by Nero) in the apocryphal Acts of Peter (c. 200). The account ends with Paul still alive and Nero abiding by God's command not to persecute any more Christians.

By the fourth century, a number of writers were stating that Nero killed Peter and Paul.

Antichrist

The Sibylline Oracles, Book 5 and 8, written in the second century, speak of Nero returning and bringing destruction. Within Christian communities, these writings, along with others, fueled the belief that Nero would return as the Antichrist. In 310, Lactantius wrote that Nero "suddenly disappeared, and even the burial place of that noxious wild beast was nowhere to be seen. This has led some persons of extravagant imagination to suppose that, having been conveyed to a distant region, he is still reserved alive; and to him they apply the Sibylline verses." Lactantius maintains that it is not right to believe this.

In 422, Augustine of Hippo wrote about 2 Thessalonians 2:1–11, where he believed that Paul mentioned the coming of the Antichrist. Although he rejects the theory, Augustine mentions that many Christians believed Nero was the Antichrist or would return as the Antichrist. He wrote that, "in saying, 'For the mystery of iniquity doth already work,' he alluded to Nero, whose deeds already seemed to be as the deeds of Antichrist."

Some modern biblical scholars such as Delbert Hillers (Johns Hopkins University) of the American Schools of Oriental Research and the editors of the Oxford Study Bible and HarperCollins Study Bible, contend that the number 666 in the Book of Revelation is a code for Nero, a view that is also supported in Roman Catholic Biblical commentaries. The statement concerns Revelation 17:1-18, "the longest explanatory passage in Revelation", which predicts the destruction of Rome by work of an "eighth emperor"  who was also one of the "seven kings" of the most extended and powerful empire ever known in the human history: according to this lecture, Babylon the Great is identified with Rome which has poured the blood of saints and martyrs (verse 6) and subsequently become the seat of the Vatican State, reigning over all the kings existing on Earth.

See also
 Nero in popular culture
 List of Roman emperors

Notes

References

Bibliography

Ancient sources
 Tacitus, Histories, I–IV (c. 105)
 Tacitus, Annals, XIII–XVI (c. 117)
 Josephus, War of the Jews, Books II–VI (c. 94)
 Josephus, Antiquities of the Jews, Book XX (c. 94)
 Cassius Dio, Roman History, Books 61–63 (c. 229)
 Plutarch, The Parallel Lives, The Life of Galba (c. 110)
 Philostratus II, Life of Apollonius Tyana, Books 4–5, (c. 220) 
 Suetonius, The Lives of Twelve Caesars, the Life of Nero (c. 121)

Modern sources
 
 Cronin, Vincent. Nero. London: Stacey International, 2010.
 
 Grant, Michael. Nero. New York: Dorset Press, 1989.
 Griffin, Miriam T. Nero: The End of a Dynasty. New Haven, CT; London: Yale University Press, 1985 (hardcover); London / New York: Routledge, 1987 (paperback).
 Holland, Richard. Nero: The Man Behind the Myth. Stroud: Sutton Publishing, 2000 (paperback ).
  Minaud, Gérard, Les vies de 12 femmes d'empereur romain – Devoirs, Intrigues & Voluptés , Paris, L'Harmattan, 2012, ch. 4, La vie de Poppée, femme de Néron, pp. 97–120.
 
 Warmington, Brian Herbert. Nero: Reality and Legend. London: Chatto & Windus, 1969 (hardcover); New York: W.W Norton & Company, 1970 (paperback); New York: Vintage, 1981 (paperback).

External links

 
 International Society for Neronian Studies
 Nero, Roman Emperor, Encyclopædia Britannica online
 The Roman Empire in the First Century: Nero, PBS.org
 Nero (37 AD – 68 AD), BBC.co.uk
 Emperor Nero: Facts & Biography, Live Science online
 Roman Emperor Nero: Rethinking Nero, National Geographic online

 
37 births
68 deaths
1st-century Roman emperors
Ancient Roman adoptees
Ancient Romans who committed suicide
Suicides by sharp instrument in Italy
Bisexual men
Children of Claudius
Claudii Nerones
Domitii Ahenobarbi
LGBT Roman emperors
Matricides
People from Anzio
People of the Year of the Four Emperors
Anti-Christian sentiment in Europe
Persecution of early Christians
Poppaea Sabina
Roman emperors to suffer posthumous denigration or damnatio memoriae
Roman-era Olympic competitors
Roman pharaohs
Roman philhellenes
Talmud people
Uxoricides